Simon Ramet (born 13 March 2003) is a French professional footballer who plays as a right-back for Lille.

Club career
Ramet is a youth product of Étaples, Boulogne and Lille. He started playing with Lille's reserves in 2021 after converting to right-back from winger. He made his senior and professional debut with Lille as a late substitute in a 2–0 Ligue 1 win over Toulouse FC on 18 March 2023.

References

External links
 
 

2003 births
Living people
People from Boulogne-sur-Mer
French footballers
Association football fullbacks
Lille OSC players
Ligue 1 players
Championnat National 3 players